"Rock and Roll, Hoochie Koo" is a rock song written by American musician Rick Derringer. It was first recorded in 1970 by Johnny Winter and his band Johnny Winter And, of which Derringer was a member. In 1973, Derringer recorded a solo version, which was his only Top 40 chart hit as a solo artist in the U.S. It became a staple of 1970s classic rock radio and rock music compilations. Both Winter and Derringer have recorded multiple live versions of the song.

Original version
"Rock and Roll, Hoochie Koo" was initially recorded by Johnny Winter in 1970 with his band "Johnny Winter And", which included Rick Derringer and other former members of the McCoys.  According to Derringer:
  
However, Winter noted, "The reviewers liked it. I didn't think 'Rock and Roll, Hoochie Koo' would do as well as it did 'cause it was a little corny. Rock and Roll, Hoochie Koo. You don't ever know".  The song is included on the Johnny Winter And album, which reached number 154 on the Billboard 200 album chart.

In 1970, they recorded the song during the Live Johnny Winter And tour, which was released as Live at the Fillmore East 10/3/70 in 2010. In a review of the album for AllMusic, Thom Jurek commented that "this one blows away the JWA [Johnny Winter And] studio version or Derringer's own hit single take", although he felt it did not measure up to the other songs recorded that night. Winter and Derringer later recorded the song with Winter's brother for Edgar Winter's White Trash live 1972 album Roadwork, described in an album review as a "rousing rendition".

Rick Derringer version

Rick Derringer recorded the song for his 1973 solo debut album All American Boy. He plays guitar, bass, and tambourine and sings the lead vocal, with Bobby Caldwell on drums and Carl Hall, Lani Groves, and Tasha Thomas providing the backing vocals. The song was recorded at Caribou Ranch near Nederland, Colorado.

Edited for release as a single on Winter's Blue Sky Records, it reached number 23 on the Billboard Hot 100 chart in 1974. In Australia, the single reached number 84.

In a retrospective song review for AllMusic, Stephen Thomas Erlewine described it as: 

Over the years Derringer recorded several live versions of "Rock and Roll, Hoochie Koo".

References

1970 songs
1974 singles
Song recordings produced by Bill Szymczyk
Columbia Records singles
American hard rock songs